NCSO may refer to:

Nassau County Sheriff's Office (Florida)
North Carolina Science Olympiad
National Census and Statistics Office, a preceding agency of the Philippine Statistics Authority
National Construction Safety Officer, a Canadian certified safety professional designation
NERC Certified System Operator, an American professional designation